Mountain City is the name of several places, mainly in the United States:

 Mountain City, Georgia
 Mountain City, Nevada
 Mountain City, Tennessee
 Mountain City, Texas
 Chongqing, China, nicknamed "Mountain City"

Also:
 Mountain City (novel), a 1930 novel by Upton Sinclair